Laurisa Landre (born 27 October 1985) is a French handball player for Metz Handball and the French national team.

Individual awards
French Championship Best Pivot: 2013, 2014

References

1985 births
Living people
People from Pointe-à-Pitre
French female handball players
Guadeloupean female handball players
Expatriate handball players
French expatriate sportspeople in Romania
Olympic handball players of France
Olympic medalists in handball
Olympic silver medalists for France
Medalists at the 2016 Summer Olympics
Handball players at the 2016 Summer Olympics